Frédéric Salat-Baroux (born 12 July 1963) is a French civil servant serving as the chief of staff of President Jacques Chirac between 2005 and 2007.

Personal life
On 11 February 2011, Salat-Baroux married Claude Chirac, daughter of President Jacques Chirac

References

1963 births
Living people
ESCP Europe alumni
Sciences Po alumni
École nationale d'administration alumni
Members of the Conseil d'État (France)